The Brazil women's national artistic gymnastics team represents Brazil in FIG international competitions.

History
Brazil has participated in the Olympic Games women's team competition four times. It has also participated in the women's team competition at the World Artistic Gymnastics Championships 18 times.  At the 2020 Olympic Games, Rebeca Andrade became the first Brazilian to win an Olympic medal in women's artistic gymnastics, winning silver in the individual all-around.

Current roster

As of March 14, 2023:

Team competition results

Olympic Games
 1928 through 2000 — did not participate
 2004 — 9th place
Camila Comin, Daniele Hypólito, Caroline Molinari, Ana Paula Rodrigues, Daiane dos Santos, Laís Souza
 2008 — 8th place
Jade Barbosa, Ethiene Franco, Daniele Hypólito, Daiane dos Santos, Ana Cláudia Silva, Laís Souza
 2012 — 12th place
Daniele Hypólito, Ethiene Franco, Harumy de Freitas, Bruna Leal, Daiane dos Santos
 2016 — 8th place
Daniele Hypólito, Jade Barbosa, Rebeca Andrade, Flávia Saraiva, Lorrane Oliveira. Alternate: Carolyne Pedro
 2020 — did not participate

World Championships

 1934 through 1974 — did not participate
 1978 — 19th place
 1979 — 23rd place
Silvia dos Anjos, Lilian Carrascoza, Marian Fernandes, Cláudia Magalhaes, Jacqueline Pires, Altair Prado
 1981 — 19th place
Danilce Campos, Lilian Carrascoza, Carine Leao, Cláudia Magalhaes, Jacqueline Pires, Altair Prado
 1983 — 22nd place
Danilce Campos, Marian Fernandes, Tatiana Figueiredo, Cláudia Magalhaes, Jacqueline Pires, Altair Prado
 1985 — 20th place
Marian Fernandes, Tatiana Figueiredo, Elena Fournogerakis, Vanda Oliveira, Jacqueline Pires, Altair Prado
 1987 — 21st place
Marian Fernandes, Tatiana Figueiredo, Vanda Oliveira, Luisa Parente, Priscilla Steinberger, Margaret Yada
 1989 — 22nd place
Adriane Andrade, Anna Fernandes, Anna Paula Luck, Daniela Mesquita, Luisa Parente, Margaret Yada
 1991 — 28th place
Debora Biffe, Marina Fagundes, Anna Fernandes, Luisa Parente
 1994 — did not participate
 1995 — 21st place
Soraya Carvalho, Beatriz Degani, Mariana Gonçalves, Leticia Ishii, Liliane Koreipasu, Beatrice Martins, Melissa Sugimote
 1997 — did not participate
 1999 — 18th place
Heine Araújo, Camila Comin, Marilia Gomes, Daniele Hypólito, Stefani Salani, Daiane dos Santos
 2001 — 11th place
Heine Araújo, Coral Borda, Camila Comin, Daniele Hypólito, Stefani Salani, Daiane dos Santos
 2003 — 8th place
Camila Comin, Daniele Hypólito, Caroline Molinari, Ana Paula Rodrigues, Daiane dos Santos, Laís Souza. Alternate: Thais Silva
 2006 — 7th place
Camila Comin, Bruna da Costa, Daniele Hypólito, Daiane dos Santos, Juliana Santos, Laís Souza
 2007 — 5th place
Jade Barbosa, Khiuani Dias, Daniele Hypólito, Daiane dos Santos, Ana Cláudia Silva, Laís Souza
 2010 — 10th place
Jade Barbosa, Priscila Cobello, Ethiene Franco, Adrian Gomes, Daniele Hypólito, Bruna Leal
 2011 — 14th place
Jade Barbosa, Adrian Gomes, Daniele Hypólito, Bruna Leal, Daiane dos Santos, Ana Cláudia Silva
 2014 — 16th place
Leticia Costa, Isabelle Cruz, Daniele Hypólito, Maria Cecília Cruz, Mariana Oliveira, Julie Sinmon. Alternate: Mariana Valentin
 2015 — 9th place
Jade Barbosa, Daniele Hypólito, Thauany Lee, Leticia Costa, Flávia Saraiva, Lorrane Oliveira. Alternate: Lorenna Antunes
 2018 — 7th place
Jade Barbosa, Rebeca Andrade, Thaís Fidélis, Flávia Saraiva, Lorrane Oliveira. Alternate: Carolyne Pedro
 2019 — 14th place
Jade Barbosa, Letícia Costa, Thaís Fidélis, Lorrane Oliveira, Flávia Saraiva
 2022 — 4th place
Rebeca Andrade, Flávia Saraiva, Lorrane Oliveira, Júlia Soares, Carolyne Pedro. Alternate: Christal Bezerra

Most decorated gymnasts

This list includes all Brazilian female artistic gymnasts who have won a medal at the Olympic Games, the World Artistic Gymnastics Championships or the FIG World Cup Final from 1975 to 2008.

Best international results

See also
Brazil at the World Artistic Gymnastics Championships
Gymnastics at the Pan American Games
Gymnastics at the South American Games
Pan American Gymnastics Championships
South American Gymnastics Championships
List of Olympic female artistic gymnasts for Brazil

References

Gymnastics in Brazil
National women's artistic gymnastics teams
Women's national sports teams of Brazil